Erik George Sebastian Smith (25 March 19314 May 2004) was a German-born British record producer, pianist and harpsichordist.  He produced over 90 opera recordings.  His greatest legacy is the 1991 complete recording of the entirety of Wolfgang Amadeus Mozart's compositions, which included many previously unheard fragments and was released for the bicentennial of Mozart's death.

Biography
He was born in Rostock, the son of the German conductor Hans Schmidt-Isserstedt.  His Jewish mother took him from Germany in 1936, with his brother, to be brought up in England.  He did his tertiary education at Corpus Christi College, Cambridge.

Through his friendship with the American pianist Julius Katchen, he joined the Decca company as a record producer, working with such people as John Culshaw and Gordon Parry.

In 1958 he produced the first recording of Peter Grimes, conducted by the composer Benjamin Britten.  He also produced the first recording of Mozart's opera La clemenza di Tito, with the conductor István Kertész, in 1967.

Erik Smith formed the London Wind Soloists and the Vienna Mozart Ensemble in order to record the complete wind music and the complete dances and marches of Mozart.  Many of these were premiere recordings.

In 1967 he moved to Philips.  Here, he produced a series of Haydn operas, many early Verdi operas, Tippett's The Midsummer Marriage, and Berlioz's The Trojans and Benvenuto Cellini.  Many of these were premiere recordings.

In 1991 he created his master work, the Complete Mozart Edition, on 180 CDs.  He even completed some of Mozart's unfinished works, such as the finale of the String Quartet, K. 464.

After his formal retirement in 1991, he continued to devote time to projects such as Mitsuko Uchida's cycle of Schubert sonatas.

He won Grammy Awards in 1971, 1973, 1976 and 2003.

Erik Smith died on 4 May 2004, survived by his wife Priscilla and two daughters, Miranda and Susanna.

Partial discography
 Haydn: La fedeltà premiata (Antal Doráti recording)
 Haydn: Il mondo della luna (Antal Doráti recording)

Sources
Cairns, David (May 11, 2004). "Obituary: Erik Smith, Record producer breaking new ground with Mozart and Berlioz". The Guardian
The Daily Telegraph (May 17, 2004). ""Obituary: Erik Smith"

1931 births
2004 deaths
British record producers
British classical pianists
British harpsichordists
Grammy Award winners
Alumni of Corpus Christi College, Cambridge
20th-century classical musicians
20th-century pianists
20th-century British musicians